Ángel Marcos Salas (Madrid, 1904 - Toulouse, 1988) was a Spanish trade unionist.

Biography 
Ángel Marcos Salas was born in Madrid in 1904, into a working class family. He worked on the railroads, becoming member of the National Confederation of Labor (CNT). 

In July 1936, after the outbreak of the Spanish Civil War, he was appointed a member of the Confederal Committee at Madrid Central Station and shortly afterwards took charge of a century of the Rosal Column. Later he became part of the political commissariat of the Spanish Republican Army. He came to serve as commissar of the 30th, 80th and 140th mixed brigades, taking part in the Battle of the Ebro. After the end of the war he went into exile in France, where he was interned in a concentration camp.

He went on to live in the French city of Toulouse, where he would continue developing various activities within the CNT until his death in 1988.

References

Bibliography
 
 
 

1904 births
1988 deaths
Confederación Nacional del Trabajo members
Exiles of the Spanish Civil War in France
Spanish anarchists
People from Madrid